Love Potion #9 is an album by jazz organist Johnny "Hammond" Smith recorded for the Prestige label in 1966.

Reception

The Allmusic site awarded the album 3 stars stating "Since there is less than half-an-hour of music here and nothing unexpected occurs, this is just an average outing, although it should please jazz organ fans".

Track listing
All compositions by Johnny "Hammond" Smith except where noted
 "Love Potion #9" (Jerry Leiber, Mike Stoller) - 2:50   
 "A Taste of Honey" (Bobby Scott, Ric Marlow) - 3:20   
 "The Impossible Dream" (Mitch Leigh, Joe Darion) - 3:10   
 "Blues on Sunday" - 5:10   
 "Sunny" (Bobby Hebb) - 3:10   
 "The Shadow of Your Smile" (Johnny Mandel, Paul Francis Webster) - 3:40   
 "Kimberly's Delight" - 2:50   
 "Up Comes Monday" - 5:30

Personnel
Johnny "Hammond" Smith - organ
Virgil Jones - trumpet
Gene Walker - tenor saxophone
Eddie Diehl - guitar
John Harris - drums

Production
 Cal Lampley - producer
 Rudy Van Gelder - engineer

References

Johnny "Hammond" Smith albums
1967 albums
Prestige Records albums
Albums produced by Cal Lampley
Albums recorded at Van Gelder Studio